Zulya Nazipovna Kamalova (born in Sarapul, Udmurt ASSR) is an Australian singer. She currently resides in Australia though tours Europe frequently.

Life
Kamalova grew up in Tatarstan and began performing and writing music at age 9. She is of Volga Tatar background. In 1991, she moved to Australia, settling in Hobart, Tasmania. After extensive performing solo and with accompanists and releasing several limited-run cassettes and a full-length album Journey of Voice, she moved to Melbourne. She later formed the band Children of the Underground and signed to Melbourne-based independent record label Unstable Ape Records in 2004.

Musical style
Kamalova is known for her interpretations of Tatar and Russian music, often playing with a backing band Children of the Underground. Instrumentation typically includes accordion, double bass, percussion, guitar, brass and string arrangements and occasionally jaw harp.

Discography

Albums

Awards and nominations

ARIA Music Awards
The ARIA Music Awards is an annual awards ceremony that recognises excellence, innovation, and achievement across all genres of Australian music. They commenced in 1987.

! 
|-
| 2003
| Elusive
| ARIA Award for Best World Music Album
| 
| 
|-
| 2007
| 3 Nights
| Best World Music Album
| 
| 
|-

Music Victoria Awards
The Music Victoria Awards are an annual awards night celebrating Victorian music. They commenced in 2006.

|-
| 2013
| Zulya and the Children of the Underground
| Best Global or Reggae Act
| 
|-

References

External links

Living people
People from Sarapul
Perm State University alumni
Russian multi-instrumentalists
Russian musicians
Russian women musicians
World Music Awards winners
Jaw harp players
Soviet emigrants to Australia
Volga Tatar people
Westpark Music artists
1969 births